This is an incomplete list of mayors of Minot, North Dakota.

List

References

Minot, North Dakota